Fathabad (also Romanized as Faţḩābād and Fatḩābād) is a village in Ferdows Rural District, Ferdows District, Rafsanjan County, Kerman Province, Iran. At the 2006 census, its population was 147, in 37 families.

References 

Populated places in Rafsanjan County